Neophilologus: An International Journal of Modern and Mediaeval Language and Literature, is an ongoing peer-reviewed journal devoted to the study of modern and mediaeval languages and literature,  including general linguistics, literary theory and comparative literature. The journal started in 1915 and is now published by Springer Science+Business Media BV.

The journal publishes articles in five languages: English, French, German, Italian and Spanish.

References

External links
 Homepage at Springer

Springer Science+Business Media academic journals
Publications established in 1915
Multilingual journals
Linguistics journals
Quarterly journals